The Italian Air Force (AM) is the air force of the Italian Republic. Since its formation, the service has held a prominent role in modern Italian military history.

History

Early history and World War I
Italy was among the earliest adopters of military aviation. Its air arm dates back to 1884, when the Italian Royal Army was authorised to acquire its own air component. The Air Service operated balloons based near Rome.

In 1911, reconnaissance and bombing sorties during the Italo-Turkish War by the Servizio Aeronautico represented the first use of heavier-than-air aircraft in armed conflict.

The  and World War II
On 28 March 1923, the Italian Air Force was founded as an independent service by King Vittorio Emanuele III of the Kingdom of Italy. During the 1930s, the fledgling  was involved in its first military operations, first in Ethiopia in 1935, and later in the Spanish Civil War between 1936 and 1939. After a period of neutrality, Italy entered World War II on 10 June 1940 alongside Germany. The Regia Aeronautica could deploy more than 3,000 aircraft, although fewer than 60% were serviceable. It fought from the icy steppes of Russia to the sands of the North African desert, losing men and machines.

The Air Force was split into the Italian Co-Belligerent Air Force in the south aligned with the Allies, and the pro-Axis  in the north until the end of the war. On 8 May 1945, the hostilities ended, beginning the rebirth of military aviation in Italy.

A popular vote by the people resulted in the end of the Kingdom of Italy and the establishment of the Italian Republic on 18 June 1946.

The Peace Treaty of Paris of 1947 placed severe restrictions on all of the Italian armed forces, but the establishment of NATO in 1949 with Italy as a founding member brought about the necessity for the modernization of all of the Italian armed forces, including the Italian Air Force. American military aid sent by the Mutual Defense Assistance Program brought about the introduction of American-made P-47 Thunderbolt and P-51 Mustang propeller-driven fighter planes. In 1952, the Italian Air Force was granted jet fighters for the first time, American F-84G Thunderjets and F-86D Sabres, together with over 200 licence-built British de Havilland Vampires; these were followed by Republic F-84F Thunderstreak fighters and C-119 Flying Boxcar transport planes from the United States. The reborn Italian aviation industry also began to develop and produce a few indigenous aircraft designs of its own, such as the Fiat G91, the Aermacchi MB-326, the Piaggio Aero P.166 and the line of Agusta-Bell helicopters.

The first supersonic fighters added to the Italian Air Force were American-designed F-104 Starfighters that were produced by a group of several European aircraft companies, including Messerschmitt-Bölkow-Blohm, Dornier, Fiat, Fokker and SABCA. During the 1970s, the Air Force acquired the Italian Aeritalia G222 and the modern American C-130 Hercules tactical transport planes, capable of carrying cargo or paratroopers. It also received the new Aeritalia F-104S Starfighter Starfighter fighters for ground attack and air-defence purposes.

A push to expand the Italian aircraft industry led Italy into the huge trilateral project that developed the Panavia Tornado fighter-bomber and air-defence fighters along with West Germany and the United Kingdom. Tornado fighters were still in service with all three countries, plus a few more, as of 2019. Italian companies worked with the Embraer Company of Brazil in a smaller project to develop and produce the AMX International AMX aircraft.

From the end of the Cold War to present day 
In 1990, after the Iraqi invasion of Kuwait, Italy joined the coalition forces, and for the first time in 45 years Italian pilots and aircraft were assigned to combat operations. Needing to replace the obsolete F-104 Starfighters, Italy joined with Germany, Spain and the United Kingdom in the development of the Eurofighter Typhoon, which was expected to enter the Italian Air Force in 2000. In 1994, with the Typhoon still some years from introduction to service, 24 Panavia Tornado Air Defense Variant (ADV) interceptors were leased from the United Kingdom for a period of 10 years. The ADV Tornados served as fighter-interceptors to supplement and then to replace the old F-104 Starfighters. However, delays in the production of the Typhoon forced the Italians to seek a supplement, and then replacement, for the leased Tornado ADVs.

With the UK lease due to expire in 2004, the Italian government wished to avoid a costly lease extension and instead opted to lease 34 F-16 Fighting Falcon multi-role fighter planes on multi-year leases from the US. The last of these fighters was returned to the United States in May 2012, following the Italian Air Force's acquisition of a sufficient number of Typhoons over a period of several years. The Typhoons are intended to replace all of the F-104, Tornado ADV and F-16 aircraft. The last of the Italian F-104s was withdrawn from service in 2004.

Armed conflicts in Somalia, Mozambique and the nearby Balkans led to the Italian Air Force becoming a participant in multinational air forces, such as that of NATO over the former Yugoslavia, just a few minutes flying time east of the Italian peninsula. The commanders of the Italian Air Force soon saw the need to improve the Italian air defences.

The capability of the Italian Air Force as a transportation unit has been improved with the acquisition of 22 American C-130J tactical transports and 12 Alenia C-27J Spartans, which have replaced all of the G222s. In 2003, the Italian Air Force extended its capabilities to small-scale land warfare by small special-forces units. This was accomplished by forming the 17º Stormo Incursori ("17th Special Operations Wing"), also known as RIAM ("Air Force Raiders Group"), a unit that is primarily responsible for raids on land-based aeronautical compounds, forward air control missions and combat search and rescue operations.

Equipment

As of 2014, the Italian Air Force operates a total active fleet of 557 aerial vehicles, including 209 manned and 12 unmanned combat aircraft, with eight more Eurofighter Typhoon on order and 75 more F-35s planned.

Organisation

Rank structure

Officers

Enlisted

See also
 Italian Armed Forces
 Carabinieri
 Guardia di Finanza
 Italian Army
 Italian Navy
 International Flight Training School
 Uniforms of the Italian Armed Forces
 Centro Sportivo Aeronautica Militare
 List of aircraft used by Italian Air Force
 List of Regia Aeronautica aircraft used in World War II
 List of World War I Entente aircraft

References

Sources
 
 Malizia, Nicola. F-47D "Thunderbolt" (Aviolibri Records n.6) (Bilingual Italian/English). Rome, Italy: IBN Editore, 2005. .
 Mattioli, Marco. Lockheed P-38 Lightning in Italian Service, 1943–1955 (Aviolibri Records n.4) (Bilingual Italian/English). Rome, Italia: IBN Editore, 2004. .

External links

 Aeronautica Militare web page

 
Military units and formations established in 1923
Aeronautica Militare
1923 establishments in Italy